Kyaukkyi is a town in Kyaukkyi Township, Taungoo District, Bago Region in Myanmar. It is the administrative seat of Kyaukkyi Township.

Notes

External links
“Kyaukkyi Map — Satellite Images of Kyaukkyi” Maplandia

Township capitals of Myanmar
Populated places in Bago Region